Un canto a Galicia is 1972 album by Julio Iglesias. The song of the same name which is actually sung in the Galician language also known as Gallego, and it was one of Iglesias's best known hits which led to him being known all over Europe and one of the top three artists in Latin America by 1975. Billboard cites it as Iglesias's "first big sales success", and that he also recorded it in Japanese and German, with notable success in Europe, Japan and Mexico.

Track listing

 A-Side

 "Un canto a Galicia" (4:15)	
 "Hombre solitario" (2:29)	
 "Veces llegan cartas" (3:08)	
 "Rio rebelde" (2:54)
 "Si volvieras otra vez" (3:36)

 B-side

 "Por una mujer" (4:53)	 
 "No soy de aqui" (3:43)	 
 "En un rincón del désvan" (4:29)
 "Sweet Caroline" (3:34)	
 "Como el álamo al camino" (3:45)

See also
List of best-selling Latin albums

References

1972 albums
Julio Iglesias albums
Spanish-language albums